Preston Lions Football Club (formerly Preston Makedonia Soccer Club) is a soccer club from Preston, a northern suburb of Melbourne, Victoria, Australia. The club was established in 1947 to play non-professional soccer matches against other teams in the local community until 1959, and 12 years later, they joined the Victorian Soccer Federation (now Football Victoria), the club's first season in an officially sanctioned competition. The Lions currently compete in the National Premier Leagues Victoria 2 competition after being promoted in 2022, which is the third tier in the Australian soccer league system. The club won the Victorian Premier League in seasons 1980,1994, 2002 and 2007.

History

Foundation
The club was founded in 1947 and was affiliated with the Victorian Soccer Federation (now Football Victoria) in 1959. Based in the suburb of Preston, Victoria, the Macedonia Soccer Club was originally created as a focal point for the newly immigrated Macedonian community to gather and socialise, and to provide the then youth with the opportunity to learn and play the "world game" that was so popular back in their homeland of Macedonia.

Transformation of the club and affiliation to VSF
In 1959 the club established itself from an amateur club to a semi-professional club, and a change of name to the Preston Makedonia Soccer Club with promotion to the Victorian Division Two (South Competition). Preston Makedonia moved forward in leaps and bounds to become champions of the Victorian Metropolitan League Division One in 1966, and as a result, was promoted to the state's top competition, the Victorian State League in 1967.

The club first experienced championship success at the state's top level in 1975 and again in 1980. As Victorian champions, Preston Makedonia competed in a play-off against other state champions and in 1981 they were promoted to the then National Soccer League (NSL) competition.

During this significant period of growth the need for much larger facilities became apparent and the club consequently moved from its home base of T.A. Cochrane Reserve in Collier Street, Preston, to its current home ground at B.T. Connor Reserve in nearby Reservoir. The Preston Lions Social Club was also established around the same time and is located directly opposite the ground.

National Soccer League
Preston Makedonia continued to compete successfully in the NSL for the next 13 years, achieving their best finish in 1987 as runner-up in the Southern Division Championship. In 1992 Preston Makedonia took out the prestigious Dockerty Cup in a thrilling penalty shootout against arch rivals South Melbourne. However financial difficulties led to poor performances and in 1993 Preston Makedonia played their last match in the NSL.

Victorian Premier League
Relegated to the Victorian Premier League, Preston Makedonia were once again crowned Victorian champions in 1994. Around this time, Soccer Australia forced VPL clubs to abolish any ethnicity associated with their club names. Preston Makedonia Soccer Club was renamed the Preston Lions Soccer Club. The club has since adopted the title of the Preston Lions Football Club, following the lead set by the sports’ governing body and keeping in line with how the game is known in the UK and countries where people don't speak English–as "football".

The club experienced a disastrous campaign in 1995, being relegated to the Victorian State League Division 1 after finishing bottom of the Premier League. Championship winning coach Peter Ollerton was sacked after five games with a record of 1 win, 1 draw and 3 losses to start the '95 campaign. Sean Lane came in on 2 April but lasted just 13 games with a 3–5–5 record. Norrie Pate oversaw the rest of the campaign as head manager but was unable to avoid the drop. Preston bounced straight back to the Premier League, winning promotion with their 2nd-place finish in the '96 State League 1.

Makedonia would once again become Victorian Premier League champions in both 2002 and 2007, adding to its already impressive collection of trophies. Preston had 3 points deducted at the start of the 2007 season, making the feat all the more impressive. The 2007 grand final at Bob Jane Stadium against Whittlesea Zebras was attended by an estimated 4,500 people.

Recent History
In season 2009, in the club's 50 year anniversary, Preston finished the season in 12th place and were relegated, just two seasons after being crowned VPL Champions. Makedonia managed just 7 points all season in what was one of the worst ever VPL seasons recorded. Preston narrowly avoided relegation in 2010, finishing one point above the relegated FC Clifton Hill, qualifying to the relegation playoff against State League 2 side Diamond Valley United, winning the encounter 1–0 through a Robert Najdovski goal.

Preston's fall from grace was continued in the 2011 State League One season, where the club was not able to avoid relegation, finishing bottom of the table. Makedonia experienced many heavy defeats in the 2011 season, finished with 56 goals conceded, 17 more than any other side in the competition.

Preston Lions, playing in the third tier of football in Victoria for the first time in over 30 years, had a disappointing 2012 season, finishing mid-table. 2013 was more of the same for the historic outfit, placing 7th in the regionalised Victorian State League 2 North-West.

After the inception of the National Premier Leagues Victoria, Preston were "promoted" to the Victorian State League 1 North-West, but as the Premier League was split into two divisions, Preston remained at essentially the same tier, the third, as they were before in the Victorian football pyramid.

The 2014 season saw the Lions manage a 2nd-place finish in the league, missing out on top spot and a State League 1 NW championship by just three points. The club parted ways with head manager Josip Biskic in May and replaced him with Englishman Andy O'Dell. When O'Dell came in after Round 7, Preston were at the bottom end of the ladder. The Lions then went on an incredible run under their new coach, not losing a game for the rest of the season. A landmark moment was achieved when in August 2014, Preston were able to announce that they had eradicated their ATO debt in full, with acknowledgement arriving form the ATO in September 2014. President Zoran Trajceski resigned at the end of 2014.

The Lions followed up their 2nd-place finish in 2014 with a 4th-place finish in 2015. In June 2015, Andy O’Dell was sacked as head manager following poor results and was replaced by former player Željko Popović. Popović was initially brought in on an interim basis, but the good results he achieved until the end of the 2015 season saw him reappointed for the 2016 season. The 2016 season saw another runners-up finish in the league for the Lions, finishing six points behind champions Altona Magic SC.

With one point from three games to start the 2017 State League One season, head coach Željko Popović was replaced by former Preston Lions goalkeeper and former Hume City FC coach Lou Acevski. Acevski's first game in charge was an FFA Cup 5th qualifying round thriller, losing on penalties to fellow State League One North-West side North Sunshine Eagles FC, after the match finished 4–4 in extra time. Preston striker Chris Davies scored all four goals for his side, but blazed his penalty over the bar to give the Eagles the win. Preston finished the season in fourth place, with Davies' 14 goals enough to clinch the club's golden boot award. Robert Stambolziev also played eight games for the club, scoring nine goals.

Preston had a poor start to the 2018 season, winning just one of its opening six games. Club returnee Naum Sekulovski was given the club's captaincy. A late season charge that saw the club go 12 games undefeated, propelling the club from the bottom half to second place, saw the club come in with a chance to challenge Geelong SC for the title and subsequent promotion to the NPL. In the penultimate game of the 2018 State League 1 season, 3,869 people packed out BT Connor Reserve. A win would have seen Preston jump Geelong into first place, but the visiting club came away with a 2–0 victory, winning the championship. Queenslander Rhys Saunders was Preston's top goalscorer with 14 goals, managing the feat despite arriving mid-season.

Makedonia started the 2019 season with a 7–0 win over FC Clifton Hill, a promising sign of things to come. Preston would go undefeated until Round 11 of the season when it went down 4-2 to fellow Macedonian-backed club Sydenham Park SC. However, the club quickly recovered and went on to confirm promotion from State League 1 with a 1–0 win over Keilor Park SC. One week later, Preston claimed the State League 1 North-West championship title with a 4–0 victory over Banyule City, the club's first league title in 12 years.

Supporters
Preston has typically garnered support from the local Macedonian community across Melbourne but received much support from Macedonians all across Australia when they were competing in the NSL. Preston is well known throughout Australian football for having one of the largest and most dedicated supporter bases with crowds in the NSL often exceeding that of 10,000, a large figure for the time. There have been numerous supporter groups throughout the year; including Pečalbari from the 1990s who were founded by recent Macedonian immigrants to Australia, many of whom had been involved with ultras groups back home such as Komiti and Čkembari. Other groups include the Lions Pride from the early to mid 2000s and the Preston Boys until around 2011. Today the club is supported by a variety of groups, including the Preston Makedonia Ultras and Lavovi Melbourne.

The club also has fans across Australia who are not of Macedonian heritage, with the Lions working hard to appeal to the broader football community.

Current squad

Honours

National
National Soccer League Runner-Up: (1) 1987
 National Soccer League(Southern Division) Runner-Up: (1) 1985
 National Soccer League Third Place: (1) 1983
 National Soccer League Cup Runner-Up: (2) 1985, 1990/91
 National Soccer League Finalists: (2) 1985, 1989
 Gold Cup Champions: (1) 1991

State
 Victorian Premier League/NPL Victoria Champions: (4) 1980, 1994, 2002, 2007
 Victorian Premier League/NPL Victoria Minor Premiers: (3) 1994, 2003, 2007
 Victorian Premier League/NPL Victoria Runners-Up:  1978
 Victorian Premier League/NPL Victoria Finalists: (7) 1994, 1997, 2002, 2003, 2004, 2007, 2008
 Victorian Division One/State League Division One/NPL 2 Victoria Champions: (2) 1966, 1975
 Victorian Division One/State League Division One/NPL 2 Victoria Runners-Up: (3) 1964, 1965, 1996
 National Premier League 3 Victoria Champions:  2022
 Victorian State League 1 North-West Champions: 2019
 Victorian State League 1 North-West Runners-Up: (2) 2014, 2016
 Victorian Division Two/State League Division Two Champions: (2) 1961, 1973
 Dockerty Cup Winners: (1) 1992
 Dockerty Cup Runner-Up: (2) 1985, 1986
 Victoria Cup: (1) 1980
 Federation Cup Winners: (3) 1973, 1975, 1996
 Federation Cup Runner-Up: (1) 1963
 Victorian Womens Premier League (2nd Tiers) Champions: 2022
 Victorian Womens Premier League (2nd Tiers) Minor Premiers: 2022

Metro (FFV)
Metropolitan League 3 North-West Champions: 2015

Individual awards
Victorian Premier League Gold Medal – Metropolitan Player of the Year
 2015 Ibrahim Yattara

Victorian Premier League Gold Medal – VPL Player of the Year
 2001–Chris Emsovski
 2003–Chris Emsovski
 2005–Anthony Magnacca

Bill Fleming Medal – Media voted VPL Player of the Year
 1994–Adrian Pender
 2006–Anthony Magnacca
 2007–Tony Sterjovski

Victorian Premier League Coach of the Year
 2007–Goran Lozanovski

Victorian Premier League Top Goalscorer
 1979–Gary Ward

Victorian Premier League Goalkeeper of the Year
 1999–Lou Acevski

Victorian Premier League Under 21 Player of the Year
 2005–Serkan Oksuz

Jimmy Rooney Medal – VPL Grand Final Man of the Match
 1994–Chris Sterjovski
 2002–John Spazaovski
 2007–Zoran Petrevski

Weinstein Medal Junior Player of the Year
 1989-Robert Spasevski

Representative Football
Australian Representatives – Senior Level
 Doug Brown
 Billy Celeski
 Gary Cole
 Oscar Crino
 Robbie Dunn
 David Jones
 John Little
 George Jolevski
 Goran Lozanovski
 John Markovski
 Zarko Odzakov
 Sasa Ognenovski
 Peter Ollerton
 Con Opasinis
 George Slifkas
 Warren Spink
 Sean Lane 
 Phil Traianedes
 Kris Trajanovski
 Andrew Zinni

National Representatives – Youth Team
 John Little (AUS)
 Warren Spink (AUS)
 John Markovski (AUS)
 Robert Spasevski
 Naum Sekulovski (AUS)
 Kris Trajanovski (AUS)
 Goran Lozanovski (AUS)
 Vasco Trpcevski (AUS)
 Bill Tijuelo (AUS)
 Daniel Miller (AUS)
 George Campbell (SCO)
 Graham Heys (ENG)
 Robert Stambolziev (AUS)

Victorian State Representatives – Senior Level
 George Campbell
 John Sapazovski
 Anthony Magnacca
 Pece Siveski
 Serkan Oksuz
 Jonathan Munoz
 Sean Lane
 Robert Spasevski
 Robert Stojcevski 
 Steve Jackson

Notable former coaches

Records
 Most Games: Chris Emsovski 158, John Sapazovski 123, Sasa Ognenovski 122
 Most Finals Games: Chris Emsovski 8
 Most Career Goals: John Sapazovski 61
 Most Season Goals: Saso Markovski 19 (1998)

Season-to-season records 

● Preston Makedonia Inaugural season *Victorian Provisional League*

1959 - 4th - 10 Teams in League.

● Victorian Metropolitan League Division 2

1960 -3rd - 10 Teams in League.

1961 - 1st - 10 Teams in League ***Promoted***  
to Victorian Division 1 South.

1962 - 10th- 12 Teams in League.

1963 -  7th -12 Teams League.

1964 - 2nd - 12 Teams in League.

1965 - 2nd - 12 Teams in League.

1966 - 1st - 12 Teams in League.  ***CHAMPIONS**

 ** Promoted**  to STATE LEAGUE. (Premier League).

1967 - 12th - 12 Teams in League. **Relegated** to Metropolitan League Division 1

1968 -3rd - 12 Teams in League.

1969 -7th - 12 Teams in League.

1970 -7th - 12 Teams in League.

1971 -8th - 12 Teams in League. **Relegated** to Metropolitan League Division 2

1972 - 3rd - 12 Teams in League.

1973 -  1st - 12 Teams in League ***CHAMPIONS****Victorian Metropolitan League Division 2
**Promoted**to Victorian 
Metropolitan League Division 1

1974 - 3rd - 12 Teams in League.

1975 -  1st ***Champions***
Victorian Metropolitan League Division 1**Promoted to State League**

1976 -  7th ' 12 Teams in League.

1977 -  10th - 12 Teams in League.

1978 - 2nd **Runners up** - 12 Teams in League.

1979 -  3rd-12 Teams in League.

1980 - 1st ***Champions*** - 12 Teams.

● Promoted to the National Soccer League (NSL) for 13 Seasons.

1981 - 12th- 16 Teams in League.

1982 - 5th- 16 Teams in League.

1983 - 3rd- 16 Teams in League.

1984 -  6th - 12 Teams in League.
 
1985 - 5th - 12 Teams in League.

1986 - 6th - 12 Teams in League.

1987 - 2nd -  14 Teams in League ** Runners Up**

1988 - 12th - 14 Teams in League.

1989 -  5th - 14 Teams in League.

1989/1990 -  9th - 14 Teams in League.

1990/1991 -  8th - 14 Teams in League.

1991/1992 -  14th - 14
Teams in League.

1992/1993 -  13th - 14 Teams in League

Season 92/93 ** Relegated** to VPL

 Victorian Premier League

1994 - 1st  ***Champions***

1995 - 12th ** Relegated ** to Victorian State League Division 1

Victorian State League Division 1

1996 -  2nd Runners - up & Promoted to Victorian Premier League

 Victorian Premier League

1997 - 4th

1998 -  8th

1999 -  3rd

2000 - 5th

2001 -  9th

2002 -  5th in regular season *Champions*

2003 -  1st *Minor Premiership*

2004 - 4th 

2005 - 7th

2006 - 7th

2007- 1st ***Champions***

2008 - 6th

2009 - 12th ** Relegated to  Victorian State League Division 1

Victorian State League Division 1

2010 -  10th 

2011 -  12th  ** Relegated to Victorian State League Division 2 N/W

2012 -  9th

2013 -  7th

2014 - 2nd

2014 season Renamed to  Victorian State League Division 1 as a result of the re-structure from FFV and the Inaugural seasons of NPL & NPL 1 *

2015 -  4th

2016 - 2nd

2017 - 4th

2018 - 3rd

2019 - 1st ***Champions*** & Promoted to NPL 3 Victoria

 National Premier League 3 Victoria

2020 - Cancelled due to the COVID-19 pandemic in Australia

2021 - Cancelled mid-season due to the COVID-19 pandemic in Australia

2022 - 1st ***Champions*** & Promoted to NPL 2 Victoria

 National Premier League 2 Victoria
Current League

See also
 List of Preston Lions players

References

External links
 Preston Lions Official website
 Preston Lions Football Club Facebook page
 Preston Lions Football Club Instagram Page
 Preston Lions Football Club Twitter Page
 Preston Lions Football Club LinkedIn Page

Archive Website
 Official Archive website
 Preston Lions Women's Football Club Official Archive Website
 Preston Lions Junior Football Club Official Archive Website

Preston Lions FC
Association football clubs established in 1947
Macedonian sports clubs in Australia
Soccer clubs in Melbourne
National Premier Leagues clubs
National Soccer League (Australia) teams
Victorian Premier League teams
Victorian State League teams
Sport in the City of Darebin
Women's soccer clubs in Australia